Milton Brewery is  in the village of Waterbeach, 6 miles (9.7 km) north of Cambridge, England. It moved in 2012 from the neighbouring village of Milton.

The brewery was established in 1999. Its first beer, Pegasus, has won several awards including Joint Bronze in the 2012 CAMRA Champion Beer of Britain Best Bitter Class. In 2006, the brewery created the Pegasus Cup which is awarded to the Cambridge University college boat club which is most successful in the annual May Bumping Races.

The Milton Brewery has a pub-owning sister company which operates the White Lion, Norwich, and the Devonshire Arms, Haymakers and Queen Edith in Cambridge.

References

External links 
Milton Brewery home page

Food and drink companies established in 1999
Companies based in Cambridgeshire
Breweries in England
British companies established in 1999
1999 establishments in England